Hodges Business College, also known as Hodges School, is a historic school building located near Mocksville, Davie County, North Carolina. It was built in 1894, and is a two-story, rectangular, Gothic Revival style brick building.  It features multiple Gothic-arched window openings and front entrance. The building housed a school into the 1910s, then was converted to tenant house, and after 1936 used for storage.  The building was converted to a residence in the 1990s.

It was added to the National Register of Historic Places in 2000.

References

School buildings on the National Register of Historic Places in North Carolina
Gothic Revival architecture in North Carolina
School buildings completed in 1894
Buildings and structures in Davie County, North Carolina
National Register of Historic Places in Davie County, North Carolina